Strange Invaders is a 2002 short animated film by animator Cordell Barker. It tells the story of Roger and Doris, a couple who lead a quiet life. When a child crashes into their living room, the couple are initially enthralled. However, the child (referred to in the credits only as "It") becomes increasingly destructive and proceeds to ransack their home and ruin their lives. Things become increasingly bizarre until Roger realises the true nature of It.

Strange Invaders was Barker's second short film after The Cat Came Back. Strange Invaders was inspired by Barker's experience as the father of his "three evil boys." Strange Invaders won numerous awards around the world and was nominated for an Oscar for Best Animated Short It was also included in the Animation Show of Shows. Strange Invaders appeared on the Canadian TV show ZeD on March 22, 2002. The film was produced in Barker's hometown of Winnipeg, Manitoba.

Cast
 Cordell Barker as Roger
 Jennifer Torrance as Doris
 Jackson Barker as It

References

External links
Watch Strange Invaders at NFB.ca

Canadian animated short films
2002 short films
Films directed by Cordell Barker
National Film Board of Canada animated short films
Canadian comedy short films
2002 animated films
2002 films
2000s animated short films
2000s English-language films
2000s Canadian films